Bistorta manshuriensis (Hangul: 범꼬리), Asian bistort, is an unresolved name for a proposed flowering plant species in the buckwheat family Polygonaceae. It is a perennial herbaceous plant found in mountain valleys and lowlands in Korea and Japan. It grows well in sunny or slightly shaded places. It grows up to  - .

Medicinal uses 
The plant contains tannins and flavonoids. Their roots are used in Korean traditional medicine for treating diarrhoea and bleeding.

References 

manshuriensis